The Springfield Armory 911 is a concealed carry semi-automatic pistol manufactured by Springfield Armory, Inc. A smaller version of a single-action hammer-fired M1911 pistol, it was first introduced in 2018 chambered in .380 ACP; the 9mm version was announced a year later. A full-length metal guide rod, removable G10 grips, a squared trigger guard, an ambidextrous safety, and drift-able fixed sights are all features of the all-metal construction.

Similar offerings from other manufacturers include the Kimber Micro and Micro 9, and the SIG Sauer P238 and P938.

References

External links
 
 Springfield Armory 911 in 380 ACP Pistol - Gunblast.com via YouTube

Semi-automatic pistols of the United States
.380 ACP semi-automatic pistols
9mm Parabellum semi-automatic pistols
Springfield Armory Inc. firearms